Mérida or Merida may refer to:

Places 
Mérida (state), one of the 23 states which make up Venezuela
Mérida, Mérida, the capital city of the state of Mérida, Venezuela
Merida, Leyte, Philippines, a municipality in the province of Leyte
Mérida, Spain, the capital city of the autonomous community of Extremadura
Mérida, Yucatán, Mexico, the capital city of the state of Yucatán

Football clubs 
CP Mérida, a defunct club in Mérida, Spain
Estudiantes de Mérida, Venezuela
Imperio de Mérida CP, Mérida, Spain
Mérida AD, a club in Mérida, Spain
Mérida F.C., Mexico
Mérida UD, a defunct club in Mérida, Spain

Other uses 
Merida (Disney), the main character of the 2012 animated film Brave
Merida (Dragon Prince), a fictional people created by fantasy author Melanie Rawn for her Dragon Prince series
Merida (moth), a genus of moth in the family Geometridae
Merida Bikes, one of the world's largest bicycle makers, based in Taiwan
Mérida Initiative, an American-led drug interdiction program for Mexico and Central America
Mérida sunangel (Heliangelus spencei), a species of hummingbird native to Venezuela
Fran Mérida, a Spanish footballer
, several ships with the name Merida
Bahrain–Merida Pro Cycling Team, a professional cycling team